The Shadow DN2, also known as the Shadow Mk.III, is a purpose-built sports prototype race car, designed, developed and built by Shadow Racing Cars to Group 7 racing specifications, to compete in the Can-Am racing series, in 1972 and 1973.

References

Sports prototypes
Can-Am cars
DN2